The Dynamo Stadium is a multi-use stadium in Stavropol, Russia. It is used as the stadium of PFC Dynamo Stavropol matches.  The capacity of the stadium is 15,589 spectators.

Events
To celebrate the 230-day anniversary of Stavropol, on 29 September 2007 a concert was held with singers like Alla Pugacheva, Philip Kirkorov, Julia Savicheva and Valdis Pelsh.

References

External links
 Stadium information

Football venues in Russia
Dynamo sports society
Sport in Stavropol
Buildings and structures in Stavropol Krai